William McDougall  (January 25, 1822 – May 29, 1905) was a Canadian lawyer, politician, and one of the Fathers of Confederation.

Biography 
William McDougall was born near York, Upper Canada (now Toronto, Ontario) to Daniel McDougall and Hannah Matthews. William was the third generation of United Empire Loyalists to settle in York. In 1793, his paternal great-great-grandparents were among the first twelve families to move to York along with 450 British troops. Those soldiers then built Fort York to protect against American invasion.

McDougall received his education at Victoria College in Cobourg, Upper Canada, and in 1847, began practicing law as an attorney and solicitor in Upper Canada. In 1862, he was called to the Upper Canada Bar.

In 1849, William McDougall's office in Toronto was the meeting place for the Clear Grit political movement.  Other Clear Grit supporters included Peter Perry, David Christie, Charles Clarke, Charles Lindsey, and Malcolm Cameron.  From 1850 to 1858, he published The North American, a liberal newspaper.

He was elected as a member of the legislative assembly in 1858 and served as Commissioner of Crown Lands and Provincial Secretary.

Gettysburg Address 
In 1863, along with Alexander Tilloch Galt, McDougall went to Washington D.C. to meet with President Abraham Lincoln in order to renegotiate the Reciprocity Treaty. During the visit, Lincoln explained that he had an important event to attend and had to travel to Pennsylvania. The president had then invited McDougall to accompany him on his trip by train and coach. They stayed the night at the private home of David Wills, a wealthy 32-year-old Gettysburg attorney.

On the following day, November 19, an opening ceremony took place at the new Gettysburg cemetery, built for dead soldiers of the American Civil War. While many orators spoke for hours, Lincoln spoke briefly, presenting the Gettysburg Address. Even though the Canadian and British press wrote positively about Lincoln's speech, the American press condemned it for its lack of length.

In July 1958, before then–US President Dwight D. Eisenhower addressed a joint session of the Parliament of Canada, Prime Minister John G. Diefenbaker recounted the tale of the friendship between McDougall and Lincoln as an example of the long history of friendship between Canada and the United States. A copy of the Hansard containing Eisenhower's speech was autographed and commented by Diefenbaker, and it can be found in the Baldwin Rooma secured archives areaof the Toronto Reference Library.

Confederation Canada 
McDougall is considered a father of Canadian confederation as he attended all three Confederation conferences. Once the dominion formed, he served as Minister of Public Works in the Macdonald government. As he had begun as Liberal and now served under Macdonald's Conservatives, he earned the nickname 'Wandering Willy'.

In the federal election of 1867 he was elected in the district of Lanark North, for the Liberal-Conservative party.

McDougall was appointed Lieutenant Governor of Rupert's Land and the North-Western Territory in 1869. The only practicable travel route at the time was through the United States with the permission of U.S. President Grant. However, when McDougall tried to enter Rupert's Land from the Dakota Territory down the Red River, he was turned back near the border by Louis Riel's troops before he could establish his authority at Fort Garry (now Winnipeg, Manitoba). Dispatches on microfiche at the Main Library of the City of Toronto include his request for 1,000 British troops to be sent on the authority of Queen Victoria. She responded that she would prefer a more amicable settlement of the jurisdiction issue. He returned to Ottawa, and campaigned against Manitoba becoming a province because of its very few inhabitants at that time. He also continued to serve as an interim leader of the North-West provisional government from Ottawa until Adams George Archibald took over on May 10, 1870.

In the federal election of 1872, he ran again for the Liberal-Conservative party in Lanark North but was defeated.  In 1875, he was elected to the Parliament of the Province of Ontario. He served as an Independent-Liberal from June 1, 1875, until September 9, 1878, for the electoral district of Simcoe South.

Second marriage and family 

In November 1872, McDougall married his second wife, Mary Adelaide Beatty. She was the daughter of Eleanor and Dr. John Beatty, a professor in Victoria University. She was born and educated at Cobourg, Ontario. Mary was involved in various philanthropic organizations including the Ottawa Humane Society. The couple lived at 407 Wilbrod Street, Ottawa. The couple had three sons, two of whom served with the Canadian contingent during the Boer War in South Africa.

His sister Emily married Liberal Senator David Reesor in 1847.

Later life and death 
In the federal election of 1878, he ran in Halton and was re-elected in the election of 1882 in Algoma and Grenville South in the election of 1887 he was defeated.

In 1890, he was promised a Senate seat, but did not pursue an appointment because his health was failing. During the conferences preceding Confederation, McDougall was personally in favour of electing members to the Senate of Canada. He was also offered a federal judgeship in British Columbia, which he turned down.

He died on May 29, 1905, due to a spine injury caused by walking off a moving train.

Political views 
McDougall was a Canada First nationalist. He espoused deep anti-Catholic and anti-Aboriginal views. He has also been called "vain, erratic and irredeemably pigheaded".

Electoral record

|}

	

|}

|}

See also
List of Northwest Territories premiers
List of Northwest Territories lieutenant-governors

References

External links
 
 
 William McDougall Library and Archives Canada
William McDougall fonds, Archives of Ontario

1822 births
1905 deaths
Canadian people of Scottish descent
Canadian Companions of the Order of the Bath
Fathers of Confederation
Members of the House of Commons of Canada from Ontario
Members of the King's Privy Council for Canada
People from Old Toronto
People of the Red River Rebellion
Lieutenant Governors of the Northwest Territories
Persons of National Historic Significance (Canada)
Canadian nationalists
Burials at Beechwood Cemetery (Ottawa)
Members of the Legislative Assembly of the Province of Canada from Canada West